Kerry Sherman (born Katherine O'Rene MacDonald, October 4, 1953, in Los Angeles, United States) is an American actress. She played Amy Perkins Wallace on the NBC soap opera Santa Barbara from 1984 to 1986.

Background
Sherman grew up in Hawaii. Her parents were Ray McDonald, a dancer and actor, and Peggy Ryan. Her father Ray died when she was young. She was not concerned with becoming an actress. Later she attended University of Hawaii for a period of time. She thought she may try a career as a veterinarian but the thought of cutting up small animals wasn't appealing to her. She worked as a stewardess for a short time, then later she thought about acting.

Career

1970s
Her earliest role was as Coline, in the "Bionic Boy" episode of The Six Million Dollar Man which aired on November 7, 1976. She played the girlfriend of the Bionic Boy (played by Vincent van Patten). The following year, she played the part of Patti in the exploitation film, Satan's Cheerleaders which was directed by Greydon Clark and starred John Ireland, Yvonne De Carlo, Jack Kruschen and John Carradine. She also appeared in a Barnaby Jones episode, "Gang War". In 1978, she played the part of Barbara in the Lou Grant episode "Hero" which also starred Marlene Warfield, Hazel Medina, Lola Mason and Jim McMullan. In 1979, she played the role of Cathy Ferguson, in the "How the west was won"'s first episode of season 3rd.

1980s

In 1982, she was in the hit movie, 48 Hrs. which starred Nick Nolte and Eddie Murphy.

In 1983, she appeared as Margaret Buchanan in the Avery Crounse directed period supernatural film,  Eyes of Fire which starred Dennis Lipscomb.

She created the role of Amy Perkins on the NBC soap opera,  Santa Barbara. She played that role from 1984 to 1986.

In 1988, she appeared in The Perfect Match, a romantic comedy about a man and woman pretending to be people they are not. It starred Marc McClure, Rob Paulsen, Jennifer Edwards, Wayne Woodson, Karen Witter, and was directed by Mark Deimel.

Filmography

References

External links

American television actresses
American soap opera actresses
Actresses from Los Angeles
Living people
1953 births
21st-century American women